Quintus Novius (fl. 30 BC), was a Roman dramatist, and composer of Atellanae Fabulae (Atellan Fables).  His efforts seem to have been directed towards giving literary dignity to this form of drama without diminishing their popular quality and traditional cast of characters.  He is known to have written his works around the same time as Lucius Pomponius, who also wrote Atellanae Fabulae; Macrobius makes reference to him as a very well-esteemed writer whose atellaniolae ("little Atellans") found a receptive audience.

Some of Novius' known works, among the forty-three that are attributed to him, include:

Sources
Meyer, Maurice, “Études sur le théâtre latin” (1847)
Imago Mundi -Atellanes

Ancient Roman comic dramatists
1st-century BC Romans
1st-century BC writers
Novii